This Is Heaven is a 1929 American pre-Code romantic comedy film directed by Alfred Santell and starring Vilma Bánky. It was produced by Samuel Goldwyn and released through United Artists.

The film concerns a newly arrived Hungarian immigrant learns to accustom herself to the new and strange life she finds in New York City.

Plot
At Ellis Island in New York City, Eva Petrie (Vilma Bánky), a newly arrived Hungarian immigrant meets her uncle, Frank Chase, a subway motorman, and his daughter, Mamie, with whom she will reside in the Bronx, Mamie gains Eva a job as a cook and waitress at Child's Restaurant on Fifth Avenue, and tries  unsuccessfully, to interest her in wealthy men. Eva spots Jimmy on the subway one morning, he is wearing a chauffeur's cap, though he is actually a millionaire. Later, she is sent to preside over a griddle at a charity bazaar, where she becomes reacquainted Jimmy —while pretending to be an exiled Russian princess. He realizes the deception and pretends to be a chauffeur. Eva and Jimmy following a romantic courtship, are married, and she insists he go into the taxi business. Uncle Frank, however, gambles their last payment on a taxi, and Eva is forced to borrow money from Mamie's wealthy lover. Jimmy then drops the pretense, revealing his true position in life, and Eva realizes "this ees Heaven"  Cast 
 Vilma Bánky as Eva Petrie
 James Hall as James Stackpoole
 Fritzi Ridgeway as Mamie Chase
 Lucien Littlefield as Frank Chase
 Richard Tucker as E.D. Wallace

Production background
Originally titled "Fifth Avenue Childs" and then "Fifth Avenue", Childs Restaurant management would not give Goldwyn permission to use their name, eventually he landed on This is Heaven.

Some scenes were filmed on location in New York City.

The film was released in both silent and sound versions. Uncertain about the future of sound films, believing that his product should either be all-talking or all-silent, and with Vilma Bánky less than diligent about her vocal lessons, Goldwyn inserted three talking sequences into this silent picture then sat on the film for several months. His instincts proved correct: it was not a success at the box-office. Bánky would make only three more films.

Reception
In a review in the St. Louis Star'', published July 1, 1929, it was declared that "Vilma's voice pleases, though it is less lovely than her blonde profile. Vilma's heaven is the tiny apartment the immigrant girl is getting in marrying James Hall, supposed chauffeur. The chauffeur is a millionaire....Best shots are the Ellis Island episodes.

References

External links 
 
 This Is Heaven at TCM
 This Is Heaven at silentera.com

1929 films
American black-and-white films
1920s English-language films
Films directed by Alfred Santell
Samuel Goldwyn Productions films
Transitional sound films
1929 romantic comedy films
American romantic comedy films
1920s American films